1996 Kashiwa Reysol season

Review and events

League results summary

League results by round

Competitions

Domestic results

J.League

Emperor's Cup

J.League Cup

Player statistics

 † player(s) joined the team after the opening of this season.

Transfers

In:

Out:

Transfers during the season

In

Out
 Kensuke Nebiki (loan to Independiente)

Awards

none

References

Other pages
 J. League official site
 Kashiwa Reysol official site

Kashiwa Reysol
Kashiwa Reysol seasons